Martin Joseph Frail (29 March 1869 – 4 September 1939) was an English footballer who lived a traditional Romani lifestyle. A goalkeeper, he played for Port Vale, Glossop North End, Derby County, Chatham, Middlesbrough, Luton Town, Brentford, and Stockport County.

Career
Frail probably joined Port Vale in the autumn of 1891. His debut came in a friendly against Lincoln City on 14 November 1891, which Vale lost 2–0. Favoured ahead of Levi Higginson, he was the keeper of choice from September 1892, and kept goal in 19 of the club's 20 Second Division games in the 1892–93 season – Vale's first season in the English Football League. However, after 11 games into the 1893–94 season, he missed the train to a match at Rotherham Town on 28 October 1893 and was duly suspended as he failed to explain the reason why. He did not play another game at the Athletic Ground and was instead transferred to Gorton Villa in October 1894. Later he played for Glossop North End, Derby County, Chatham, Middlesbrough (in two spells), Luton Town, Brentford and Stockport County before returning to Glossop.

Career statistics
Source:

References

1869 births
1939 deaths
Sportspeople from Burslem
English Romani people
Romani footballers
English footballers
Association football goalkeepers
Port Vale F.C. players
Glossop North End A.F.C. players
Derby County F.C. players
Chatham Town F.C. players
Middlesbrough F.C. players
Luton Town F.C. players
Brentford F.C. players
Stalybridge Rovers F.C. players
Stockport County F.C. players
English Football League players
Southern Football League players
Midland Football League players